The climate of the Falkland Islands is cool and temperate, regulated by the large oceans which surround it.

Winds mostly come from the west, creating a difference between the relative levels of precipitation between the eastern islands and the western islands. Although snow falls, strong winds mean it often fails to settle.

There are long hours of daylight in the summer, although the actual number of hours of sunlight is limited by cloud cover.

Köppen classification

The Falkland Islands have a maritime climate in the transition region between the tundra and subpolar zones (Köppen classifications ET and Cfc respectively). The climate is very much influenced by the cool South Atlantic ocean and its northerly Patagonian current.  The oceanic climatic type is characterised by both low seasonal and diurnal temperature ranges and no marked wet and dry season while in the sub-arctic zone the average monthly maximum temperature exceeds  for no more than four months of the year and the average monthly minimum does not drop below .

In addition to parts of the Falklands, a maritime subarctic climatic zone is found in parts of coastal Iceland, Faroe Islands, northwestern coastal Norway, southern islands of Alaska and parts of the Alaskan Panhandle, the southern tip of South America and mountainous areas of Europe including the Scottish Highlands and southwestern Norway.

Sunshine
During summer the Falklands experience long daylight hours. However, due to cloud cover, the average number of hours in summer with direct sunlight is only 6 hours. The average number in winter is only 2–3. In 2011, the Falkland Islands government announced that the islands will remain on summer time during the winter, when the clocks would normally be set back.

Winds
The winds moving over the islands are mostly westerly winds. Gales are frequent, especially during winter.

Temperature
 
The islands have cool temperatures, which fluctuates in a narrow range.

Precipitation
Rainfall remains almost constant throughout the year, although it is low because of the archipelago's location to the east of South America. Owing to the westerlies and the shielding effect of the Andes, the western side of the archipelago is much drier than the eastern side, and mountain ranges are much wetter on their eastern slopes than their western slopes. The flat areas, in particular Lafonia are the driest areas of the islands with precipitation in the range  a year. Other writers have recorded an average of 310 mm per year in the west of the islands.

The rainfall in 2009 as recorded from 17 different stations in The Wool Press varied between 356 mm at Cape Dolphin and 898 mm at Port Howard.

During winter sleet and snow does fall, but it is temporary and does not often settle for long. Due to vegetation on the islands resembling a tundra, the ground remains damp as it is often impermeable to water.

Climate changes

The climate has become drier and warmer over the past 50 years, but it is predicted that the islands will become cooler with more rain and cloud cover. This is because melting Antarctic ice is predicted to result in cooler air from the south, counteracting warmer air from the north. Sea temperature has also risen steadily since the 1960s. Rainfall data suggests that it increased from 1910 to 1940, decreased until 1995, then began to increase again. Storms are predicted to increase in frequency and intensity.

This information has been determined through meteorological data from 1923 to 1981, with most recent data not being fully analysed. The temperature of the sea around the archipelago fluctuates greatly around predicted values.

Climate statistics

References

Falkland Islands
Geography of the Falkland Islands